Guayabal is a town in the Independencia province of the Dominican Republic.

Sources 
  – World-Gazetteer.com

Populated places in Independencia Province